Plusia contexta, the connected looper, is a species of looper moth in the family Noctuidae. It is found in North America.

The MONA or Hodges number for Plusia contexta is 8952.

References

Further reading

 
 
 

Plusiini
Articles created by Qbugbot
Moths described in 1873